Upper Table Rock and Lower Table Rock are two prominent volcanic plateaus located just north of the Rogue River in Jackson County, Oregon, U.S. Created by an andesitic lava flow approximately seven million years ago and shaped by erosion, they now stand about  above the surrounding Rogue Valley.

Native Americans have inhabited the Table Rocks area for at least 15,000 years before European-American settlement. Starting in the mid-19th century during a gold rush, the settlers forced the Takelma tribe away from the Table Rocks and into reservations. The surrounding area was quickly developed. The Table Rock post office was established in 1872, an airstrip was built atop Lower Table Rock in 1948, and a very high frequency omni-directional range (VOR) aviation tower was constructed on Upper Table Rock in the 1960s. The Table Rocks were not protected until the 1970s.

The rocks are home to over 70 species of animals and 340 species of plants, which includes over 200 species of wildflowers. Vernal pools atop the plateaus fill during the rainy season in winter and spring because the andesite is impermeable. The dwarf woolly meadowfoam, a species of wildflower, grows around these pools, and is endemic to the rocks. The pools are also one of only a few places where the federally threatened species of fairy shrimp, Branchinecta lynchi, can be found. To protect these and other threatened species, the Bureau of Land Management has listed the rocks as an Area of Critical Environmental Concern since 1984.

The Table Rocks are one of the most popular hiking locations in the Rogue Valley, with over 45,000 visitors annually. Two trails, Lower Table Rock Trail and Upper Table Rock Trail, were cut across the plateaus' slopes in the early 1980s by the Youth Conservation Corps, Boy Scouts, and the Oregon Department of Forestry. This effort was coordinated by John Ifft, a forester for the Medford Office of the BLM.

The plateaus are named for their relatively flat tops. Upper and Lower refer to their location along the Rogue River, not their height.

Geology and climate

Starting approximately 40 million years ago in the middle Eocene, a braided river system called the "Ancestral Rogue River" flowed through the region where the Rogue Valley is now carved. For about 2.1 million years, the river deposited what is now known as the Payne Cliffs Formation by laying down a thin conglomerate, followed by arkosic sandstone and siltstone. Between 10 and 20 million years ago, the uplift that created the nearby Klamath Mountains caused an incision that formed the Rogue River valley.

This lava formed a hard cap over the Payne Cliffs Formation.

Since the Olson eruption, the Rogue River has eroded 90 percent of the solidified lava. Though the andesite prevented much erosion to the caps of the Table Rocks, the andesite-capped cliffs eroded from the side as the softer sedimentary units of the Payne Cliffs Formation gave way. This erosion created expansive talus fields which surround the plateaus on all sides, creating slopes capable of supporting abundant plant and animal life.

The Table Rocks offer an example of inverted relief, in which previous topographic lows are filled with a resistant rock and become new topographic highs after the erosion of the surrounding region. Each plateau is shaped roughly like a horseshoe because the lava followed the meanders of the Ancestral Rogue River.

Two caves and two former gold mines are located at the base of the andesite cap on Upper Table Rock. The caves were created by natural fractures in the cap, and the gold mines were excavated by prospectors searching for gold in the 19th century.

Human history 
Humans have lived in the Table Rock area for at least 15,000 years, based on the age of Clovis points that were discovered nearby. The region surrounding the Table Rocks was home to the Takelma people. They gathered food such as acorns and tarweed seeds, and caught salmon in the nearby Rogue River. The Takelma also used deer hides for clothing. They had several names for the rocks, including Di'tani ("rock above"), Titanakh ("little Indian plums"), and possibly Kwenphunkh. The first use of the names Upper Table Rock and Lower Table Rock is unknown, however the first recorded use was by mountain man James Clyman in 1845.

Some of the first European Americans to visit the area were fur trappers led by Peter Skene Ogden in 1827. In 1841, the United States Exploring Expedition passed through the Rogue Valley. Neither Ogden nor the expedition mentioned the Table Rocks. The gold rush of the early 1850s brought many emigrants to the area, and Table Rock City (soon renamed Jacksonville) was established several miles south of the rocks. The sudden increase of settlers created conflicts with the Rogue River Indians. These conflicts turned into warfare, and several treaties were signed in an attempt to end the hostilities. In June 1851, soldiers of the United States Army led by Major Philip Kearny attacked the Takelma near Lower Table Rock, but the Takelma were prepared. One soldier died, and three others were injured. Major Kearny returned with volunteers from Yreka soon after, accompanied by Oregon Territory delegate Joseph Lane.

Hostilities resumed in 1853, culminating in the Battle of Table Rock, which actually took place in the Evans Creek drainage. In September 1853, the Native Americans signed a peace treaty with Joseph Lane, and the Treaty with the Rogue River with Joel Palmer, which resulted in their ceding  of land in exchange for $60,000, $15,000 of which was to be used to repay white settlers for losses sustained in the hostilities and $5,000 of which was set aside to purchase agricultural implements and other improvements benefitting the Native Americans. The Takelma population underwent their first forced migration into the Table Rock Reservation, located between Upper Table Rock and nearby Evans Creek. This reservation remained open for three years, while the inhabitants were moved to other reservations. In January 1856, 400 Native Americans were moved to the Grande Ronde Reservation,  to the north. Most of the rest were relocated to the Siletz Reservation in May.

Development of the area commenced immediately and in 1872 the Table Rock Post Office was established just south of Upper Table Rock and east of Lower Table Rock. The Table Rock School District was created in 1879. In 1895 the post office's name was changed to Tablerock, and it was closed in 1906. Telephones arrived in 1908, and the Table Rock Mutual Telephone Company was established. The school district was merged with Central Point's district in 1948.

In November 1948, John Day, a local cattle rancher and developer, built a  airstrip on the surface of Lower Table Rock to impress visiting celebrities from Hollywood. Day funded residential lots near the landmark with the intent of marketing the lots to the celebrities who used the grassy runway. The runway was closed in the late 1980s, but small airplanes still occasionally attempt to land on it.

The tower's purpose is to broadcast precise coordinates to nearby aircraft to assist in navigation. The facility is closed to the public due to the threat to the safety of the occupants of the aircraft.

The Nature Conservancy became concerned about overdevelopment in 1978 and launched its largest fundraising project to that date. Collecting over $500,000 they purchased  of Lower Table Rock, creating the Lower Table Rock Preserve. Projects include prescribed burning and invasive species removal. In 1981, the Youth Conservation Corps constructed the Upper Table Rock Trail. A year later, through the efforts of John Ifft, the Lower Table Rock Trail was constructed; the first  were built by a Central Point Boy Scout troop, and the rest was built by the Oregon Department of Forestry. In 1984, the Table Rocks were designated an Area of Critical Environmental Concern by the Bureau of Land Management. In May 2009, The Nature Conservancy bought another  of land on the Table Rocks for $3.9 million, ending private ownership of the rocks.

Ecological habitats

Four overlapping ecological regions have been identified on the Table Rocks, with considerable differences in the variety of wildlife found in each. From the outermost base of the rocks, three regions consisting of oak savanna, chaparral, and mixed woodland surround the relatively flat tops. The andesite cap is covered by the fourth region, mounded prairie. This region formed when the caps were slowly eroded by the freezing and thawing of water that seeped into the ground (ice erosion), which created layers of mounded soil. Vernal pools fill in from October to June in the mounded prairie area due to the andesite's impermeability. The pools support species of plants and animals.

Over 340 species of plants grow on the rocks, including approximately 200 species of wildflowers. Some of the most common wildflowers are western buttercups, desert parsley, bicolor lupine, and California goldfields. Camas and death camas also grow on the rocks. Camas produces an edible bulb, while death camas is poisonous and was used by the Takelma as an anesthetic.

More than 70 species of animals are known to live on the Table Rocks. Lizards such as the western fence lizard, southern alligator lizard, and western skink have been seen in all four regions of the Table Rocks. Western rattlesnakes and two species of garter snakes also live in all regions. Black-tailed deer, coyotes, and bobcats are some of the mammals that live on the Table Rocks. The rocks are also home to western black-legged ticks, although they are mainly found in the chaparral region. Many species of birds live on the rocks.

The Table Rocks experience a Mediterranean climate. It rarely snows in the winter.

Oak savanna

Oak savanna is a type of grassland with scattered oak trees, found on the lowest slopes of the Table Rocks. The Takelma tribe often set fires in the oak savanna and chaparral regions to prevent brush overgrowth, creating foraging areas for animals such as deer and elk. It also prevented large wildfires. Oregon white oak and ponderosa pine are the most common trees found in the region. Buckbrush, sticky whiteleaf manzanita, Pacific madrone, deerbrush, birchleaf mountain mahogany, and Pacific poison oak are also common.

Snakes such as the ringneck snake, western yellow-bellied racer, striped whipsnake, and Pacific gopher snake live in the oak savanna region. Birds such as the oak titmouse, ash-throated flycatcher, white-breasted nuthatch, western bluebird, violet-green swallow, acorn woodpecker, black-headed grosbeak, and American kestrel have also been found in this region. The rocks are known to be the northernmost place blue-gray gnatcatchers inhabit. Gall wasps live in this area, often creating galls in oak trees by injecting their larva into their leaves and branches.

Chaparral
Chaparral is a type of shrubland, receiving very little precipitation. Sclerophyllous plants such as manzanita and buckbrush grow in this area, both relying on fire to reproduce. The rare Gentner's fritillary also grows in this region.

American black bears have been spotted in the chaparral region, usually in the fall. The most common birds include titmice and the acorn woodpecker. blue-gray gnatcatchers, lesser goldfinches, and Anna's hummingbirds have also been seen.

Mixed woodland
The mixed woodland region is a dense forest with many species of trees, located near the tops of the plateaus. The forest canopy shades the ground, resulting in a cooler temperature. The canopy also reduces the amount of water evaporation. California black oak, Douglas fir, Pacific madrone, incense cedar, and other plants grow in the mixed woodland. Shrubs such as Oregon grape, honeysuckle, blue elderberry, and Pacific poison oak also grow here. The soil in this area is mostly loam.

Rodents such as the California ground squirrel, western gray squirrel, and dusky-footed woodrat live in this region. Birds such as grosbeaks, flycatchers, western tanagers, and lazuli buntings are common in the area. Nine species of warblers, three species of vireos, and two species of thrushes can also be found. The pileated woodpecker has been spotted rarely in large pine trees.

Mounded prairie and vernal pools

The mounded prairie region is located on top of the plateaus, characterized by many species grasses and wildflowers around the vernal pools, with mounds of soil created by erosion. The dwarf woolly meadowfoam, a plant endemic to the Table Rocks, grows near these pools. They bloom for about ten days in April. When filled in the winter and early spring, the pools are also a known habitat for the vernal pool fairy shrimp (Branchinecta lynchi), a threatened species.

Two types of amphibians are found in the mounded prairie region, typically around vernal pools. The Pacific tree frog lives in large numbers on the rocks, while tadpoles of the rarer western toad can be seen between March and May. Mammals such as California voles, Heermann's kangaroo rats, raccoons, and long-tailed weasels can also be found in this region. The western meadowlark and two species of sparrows are the most common types of birds that are seen in the area. Turkey vultures, rock wren, three species of hawks, and other birds patrol the cliffs on the sides of the plateaus.

Trails

The Table Rocks offer one of the most popular hiking locations in the Rogue Valley, with over 45,000 visitors annually. Over 4,600 people per year participate in guided hikes through the Table Rock Environmental Education Program, hosted by the Bureau of Land Management and The Nature Conservancy. It has eight interpretive panels along its length, explaining the history, flora, and fauna of the region. The trails are the most popular with hikers between March and May, when the wildflowers are in bloom. Another peak occurs in September through October. Landmarks such as Mount McLoughlin, Mount Ashland, Roxy Ann Peak, and Pilot Rock are visible on clear days from the edge of the rocks.

The Youth Conservation Corps, Boy Scouts, and the Oregon Department of Forestry built the trails leading to the tops of the Table Rocks in the early 1980s, around the same time the plateaus were being nominated as an Area of Critical Environmental Concern. In June 1999, only two small trees were cut when Shady Cove contractor Randy Hodges rerouted a  section of the Lower Table Rock trail to accommodate the growing number of visitors. The project involved decommissioning the old section, expanding the parking lot, and installing  of new trail. Measures to protect the trail were implemented, such as installing rock waterbars and a layer of shale gravel over the clay.

In 2005, a program to build an interpretive trail began on Lower Table Rock near the trailhead. Prior to construction, some persons with disabilities, children, or the elderly may have been prevented from using either of the Table Rocks due to the steep terrain and narrow paths.

Both trails lead to extensive views of the surrounding areas, but have inherent dangers as well. The thick andesite caps are heavily eroded, leaving tall crumbling columns near their edges. At least six people have fallen from the Table Rocks since 2006, including a man from Central Point who tumbled through a rock shaft on Lower Table Rock to his death in May 2007 and was not found for over nineteen months. Another man from Murray, Utah fell  from Lower Table Rock and died in September 2009.

References

Bibliography
Books

News articles

Websites

Other

External links

Geology of Oregon
Nature reserves in Oregon
Native American history of Oregon
Landforms of Jackson County, Oregon
Protected areas of Jackson County, Oregon
Bureau of Land Management areas in Oregon
Nature Conservancy preserves
Lava plateaus
Protected areas established in 1984
1984 establishments in Oregon
Plateaus of the United States
Landforms of Oregon